Yokahú Tower is an observation tower within El Yunque National Forest on the island of Puerto Rico.

Background
Constructed in 1963, the tower was built by Forest Supervisor and Director of IITF, Frank H. Wadsworth.

The other tower in the El Yunque is the Mount Britton Tower. It is located at a higher elevation and usually has cloud cover that interferes with the views. Yokahu is widely considered the better of the two with regard to the view offered. When it comes to convenience, Yokahú Tower again has an advantage over the Mount Britton Tower. Yokahú Tower has a parking lot nearby whereas the Mount Britton is in the middle of the forest.

Gallery

References

Buildings and structures in Puerto Rico
Towers completed in 1963
1963 establishments in Puerto Rico
El Yunque National Forest
Observation towers